Biblioscape is a commercial information and reference management software package sold by CG Information.  The software runs only under Windows. Note: The Biblioscape support forum has had no responses from the developers since May 2016. There are questions that suggest this software may no longer be supported.

History 
Biblioscape was first released in 1998. The current release, version 10.0.3, was made available in June 2015. Version 10 was in beta testing as of March 2013.

Features 
Biblioscape is a reference management software. It has modules that allow the user to record and interlink references, notes, tasks, charts, and categories. Any of these can also be linked to web pages or other external resources. Records can be organized in folders or collections and tagged with categories.

The references module includes filters to import references from online bibliographic databases (e.g. PubMed) and from journal webpages (e.g. Proceedings of the National Academy of Sciences). When writing a paper or thesis, the user can insert temporary citations and Biblioscape can then convert them into formatted citations and generate a bibliography. For bibliographies, the user can choose from over 2,000 output styles or create new ones. The notes module is integrated with the references module, so the user can create a separately filed note from inside the reference editor. Such notes can be either independent or linked to record being edited. Biblioscape installation comes with a web server to post Biblioscape databases on the Web, and there is also a means to work in one's database remotely, if it is on a server.

See also
 Comparison of reference management software

References

External links 
 Biblioscape website
 Bibliography formatting software: An Evaluation template

Reference management software
Windows-only software